The Rayleigh–Ritz method is a direct numerical method of approximating eigenvalues, originated in the context of solving physical boundary value problems and named after Lord Rayleigh and Walther Ritz. 

The name Rayleigh–Ritz is being debated vs. the Ritz method after Walther Ritz, since the numerical procedure has been published by Walther Ritz in 1908-1909. According to, Lord Rayleigh wrote a paper congratulating Ritz on his work in 1911, but stating that he himself had used Ritz's method in many places in his book and in another publication. This statement, although later disputed, and the fact that the method in the trivial case of a single vector results in the Rayleigh quotient make the arguable misnomer persist. According to, citing Richard Courant, both Lord Rayleigh and Walther Ritz independently conceived the idea of utilizing the equivalence between boundary value problems of partial differential equations on the one hand and problems of the calculus of variations on the other hand for numerical calculation of the solutions, by substituting for the variational problems simpler approximating extremum problems in which a finite number of parameters need to be determined; see the article Ritz method for details. Ironically for the debate, the modern justification of the algorithm drops the calculus of variations in favor of the simpler and more general approach of orthogonal projection as in Galerkin method named after Boris Galerkin, thus leading also to the Ritz-Galerkin method naming. 

It is used in all applications that involve approximating eigenvalues and eigenvectors, often under different names. In quantum mechanics, where a system of particles is described using a Hamiltonian, the Ritz method uses trial wave functions to approximate the ground state eigenfunction with the lowest energy. In the finite element method context, mathematically the same algorithm is commonly called the Ritz-Galerkin method. The Rayleigh–Ritz method or Ritz method terminology is typical in mechanical and structural engineering to approximate the eigenmodes and resonant frequencies of a structure.

For matrix eigenvalue problems 
In numerical linear algebra, the Rayleigh–Ritz method is commonly applied to approximate an eigenvalue problem 

for the matrix  of size  using a projected matrix of a smaller size , generated from a given matrix  with orthonormal columns. The matrix version of the algorithm is the most simple:

 Compute the  matrix , where  denotes the complex-conjugate transpose of  
 Solve the eigenvalue problem 
 Compute the Ritz vectors  and the Ritz value 
 Output approximations , called the Ritz pairs, to eigenvalues and eigenvectors of the original matrix .

If the subspace with the orthonormal basis given by the columns of the matrix  contains  vectors that are close to eigenvectors of the matrix , the Rayleigh–Ritz method above finds  Ritz vectors that well approximate these eigenvectors. The easily computable quantity  determines the accuracy of such an approximation for every Ritz pair.

Thus, the Rayleigh–Ritz method turns into computing of the Rayleigh quotient if .

Another useful connection to the Rayleigh quotient is that  for every Ritz pair , allowing to derive some properties of Ritz values  from the corresponding theory for the Rayleigh quotient.

Example 
The matrix

has eigenvalues  and the corresponding eigenvectors

Let us take

then 

with eigenvalues  and the corresponding eigenvectors

For matrix singular value problems 
Truncated singular value decomposition (SVD) in numerical linear algebra can also use the Rayleigh–Ritz method to find approximations to left and right singular vectors of the matrix  of size  in given subspaces by turning the singular value problem into an eigenvalue problem.

Using the normal matrix 
However, the division is unstable or fails for small or zero singular values.

 
can be interpreted as a singular value problem for the  matrix . This interpretation allows simple simultaneous calculation of both left and right approximate singular vectors as follows.

 Compute the  matrix .
 Compute the thin, or economy-sized, SVD  with  matrix ,  diagonal matrix , and  matrix .
 Compute the matrices of the Ritz left  and right  singular vectors.
 Output approximations , called the Ritz singular triplets, to selected singular values and the corresponding left and right singular vectors of the original matrix  representing an approximate Truncated singular value decomposition (SVD) with left singular vectors restricted to the column-space of the matrix .

The algorithm can be used as a post-processing step where the matrix  is an output of an eigenvalue solver, e.g., such as LOBPCG, approximating numerically selected eigenvectors of the normal matrix .

Example 
The matrix 

has its normal matrix 

singular values  and the corresponding thin SVD 

where the columns of the first multiplier from the complete set of the left singular vectors of the matrix , the diagonal entries of the middle term are the singular values, and the columns of the last multiplier transposed (although the transposition does not change it)

are the corresponding right singular vectors.

Let us take

with the column-space that is spanned by the two exact right singular vectors 

corresponding to the singular values 1 and 2.

Following the algorithm step 1, we compute

and on step 2 its thin SVD  with

Finally, step 3 computes the matrix  

We validate the first vector:  

and 

Thus, for the given matrix  with its column-space that is spanned by two exact right singular vectors, we determine these right singular vectors, as well as the corresponding left singular vectors and the singular values, all exactly. For an arbitrary matrix , we obtain approximate singular triplets which are optimal given  in the sense of optimality of the Rayleigh–Ritz method.

See also 
Ritz method
Rayleigh quotient
Arnoldi iteration

Notes and references

External links
Course on Calculus of Variations, has a section on Rayleigh–Ritz method.

Numerical differential equations
Dynamical systems